The 2018 Black-Eyed Susan Stakes was the 94th running of the Black-Eyed Susan Stakes. The race took place on May 18, 2018, and was televised in the United States on the NBC Sports Network (NBCSN). Ridden by jockey Paco Lopez, Red Ruby won the race by four and three quarter lengths over runner-up Coach Rocks. Approximate post time on the Friday evening before the Preakness Stakes was 4:51 p.m. Eastern Time. The Maryland Jockey Club supplied a purse of $250,000 for the 94th running. The race was run over a sloppy (sealed) track in a final time of 1:50.17.  The Maryland Jockey Club reported a Black-Eyed Susan Stakes Day attendance of 48,265. The attendance at Pimlico Race Course that day was the second best crowd ever for Black-Eyed Susan Stakes Day and the seventh largest for a thoroughbred race in North America in 2018.

Payout 

The 94th Black-Eyed Susan Stakes Payout Schedule

$2 Exacta:  (4–3) paid   $ 30.60

$2 Trifecta:  (4–3–8) paid   $ 255.80

$1 Superfecta:  (4–3–8-9) paid   $ 475.30

The full chart 

 Winning Breeder: Hargus Sexton, Sandra Sexton & SilverFern Farm, LLC; (KY)  
 Final Time: 1:50.17
 Track Condition: Sloppy (Sealed)
 Total Attendance: Record of 48,265

See also 
 2018 Preakness Stakes
 Black-Eyed Susan Stakes Stakes "top three finishers" and # of  starters

References

External links 
 Official Black-Eyed Susan Stakes website
 Official Preakness website

2018 in horse racing
Horse races in Maryland
2018 in American sports
Black-Eyed Susan Stakes
2018 in sports in Maryland
May 2018 sports events in the United States